Rosengarten may refer to:

 the German word for "rose garden"
 Rosengarten, Lower Saxony, a municipality in Lower Saxony, Germany
 Rosengarten, Baden-Württemberg, a municipality in Baden-Württemberg, Germany
 Mannheimer Rosengarten, congress centre in Baden-Württemberg, Germany
 Rosengarten group, a massif in the Dolomites
Rosengarten zu Worms, a 13th-century German epic about Dietrich von Bern.
 Laurin, also known as the kleiner Rosengarten, another 13th-century German epic about Dietrich.

People with the surname
 Albrecht Rosengarten (1809–1893), German architect
 David Rosengarten (born 1950)
 Capt. Joseph George Rosengarten (1835–1921), Philadelphia lawyer, historian and US Civil War veteran.
 Theodore Rosengarten (born 1944), American historian

See also
Rossgarten
Rose Garden (disambiguation)

German-language surnames
Jewish surnames
Yiddish-language surnames
Surnames from ornamental names